Jan Petříček (born 18 May 1967 in Žatec) is a Czechoslovak slalom canoeist who competed in the late 1980s and early 1990s. He won two silver medals at the 1989 ICF Canoe Slalom World Championships in Savage River, Maryland in the United States, earning them in the C2 event and the C2 team event.

Petříček also finished seventh in the C2 event at the 1992 Summer Olympics in Barcelona.

His partner in the boat throughout the whole of his career was Tomáš Petříček.

World Cup individual podiums

References

Sports-reference.com profile

1967 births
Czech male canoeists
Czechoslovak male canoeists
Canoeists at the 1992 Summer Olympics
Living people
Olympic canoeists of Czechoslovakia
Medalists at the ICF Canoe Slalom World Championships
People from Žatec
Sportspeople from the Ústí nad Labem Region